James Michael Connor (born June 16, 1960, in Omaha, Nebraska) is an American actor who, making his film debut as a supporting character in the 1976 science fiction film Futureworld, has played recurring characters on several television series including Buffy the Vampire Slayer and The King of Queens, and FCU: Fact Checkers Unit (2010), as well as guest appearances on The X-Files, The Drew Carey Show, Desperate Housewives, Gilmore Girls, Rules of Engagement (2010), and Scrubs (2002).  More recently, Connor has appeared on TV in Brooklyn Nine-Nine (2013-2014), Community (2012-2014), Franklin & Bash (2014), Parks and Recreation (2012-2015,) and Vice Principals (2016-2017).

Connor has also appeared in feature films such as About Schmidt, Blades of Glory, Pendulum  and Watchmen and in the short film, The Yard Sale.  Other movie roles include The Perfect 46 (2014), and Dream World (2012).

Commercials and voiceovers
In late-2014 Connor appeared as Larry Culpepper in Dr. Pepper TV commercials tied to the NCAA college football playoffs. Connor has also contributed voiceovers for a few videogames, namely Marvel Heroes (2013), The 3rd Birthday (2011), Cloudy with a Chance of Meatballs (2009), and Gun (2005).

He attended Creighton Preparatory School in Omaha, Nebraska, with his friend, the director Alexander Payne.

References

External links

1960 births
Living people
American male film actors
American male television actors
Male actors from Omaha, Nebraska